Fadi Zaghmout is a Jordanian writer and blogger. He is best known for his debut novel Aroos Amman (2012) which was translated into English by Ruth Kemp.

Books

References

Jordanian male writers
Jordanian novelists
Year of birth missing (living people)
Living people
Alumni of the University of Sussex
Place of birth missing (living people)
Male bloggers
21st-century Jordanian writers